The Indispensable Reefs are a chain of three large coral atolls in the Coral Sea.

Administratively the Indispensable Reef belongs to the Rennell and Bellona Province of the Solomon Islands. They are locally called "Goto'akau".

The three atolls are steep-to and each encloses a large deep lagoon. The atolls of the Indispensable Reef are aligned in a NW-SE direction:

The rim of the atoll has two narrow openings in the north and northwest. There are no islets.
Little Nottingham Islet is a small islet located near the center of the reef. Besides its main lagoon, Middle Reef has a separate smaller northern lagoon.
The total area exceeds .

History
The ship Neptune struck Indispensable Reef on August 3, 1868, and was lost. The crew was rescued by the SS Boomerang.

During the Battle of the Coral Sea on May 7, 1942, two Japanese carrier attack planes B5N2 (EI-306 and probably EI-302) flying reconnaissance mission from the carrier Shokaku ditched on Indispensable Reef due to lack of fuel.

In the 1980s, the Solomon Islands Government apprehended a vessel from Taiwan that had been poaching the giant clam stocks of Indispensable Reef. Corals and endangered fish species are also being plundered for the aquarium trade.

See also

 Desert island
 List of islands

References

External links
 https://web.archive.org/web/20080120072247/http://solomonislands.com.sb/indispensablereefs.html
 Corals: 
 Sunken ships: 
 Ecological concern: 

Uninhabited islands of the Solomon Islands
Reefs of the Pacific Ocean
Atolls of the Solomon Islands
Landforms of the Coral Sea
Coral reefs
Rennell and Bellona Islands